Jarah is a sub-district located in the Al-Misrakh District, Taiz Governorate, Yemen. Jarah had a population of 1,596 according to the 2004 census.

Villages
Jarah village.
Al-'Uqur village.
Al-Kidah village.
Al-Kasar village.
Al-Ajraf village.

References

Sub-districts in Al-Misrakh District